Tyra Calderwood (born 19 September 1990) is a former professional Australian tennis player. Her highest WTA singles ranking was 607, which she reached on 6 October 2008. Her career high in doubles was 190, set on 10 September 2012.

Early life and junior career
Calderwood was born in Sydney, New South Wales and started playing tennis at the age of three.

She has had limited success on the circuit, though her junior ranking did peak at 33 in 2007.

Career
In 2008, she made her WTA doubles debut after being given a wild card with Alenka Hubacek into the Australian Open. However, they lost in the first round in straight sets. in December of that year she won the Sorrento ITF doubles title with Shannon Golds.

In 2009, she received wildcards into the doubles tournaments at both the Medibank International and the Australian Open, losing first round in both tournaments.

ITF Circuit finals

Doubles: 14 (6–8)

References

External links
 
 

1990 births
Living people
Australian female tennis players
Sportswomen from New South Wales
Tennis players from Sydney